The Guatemala Quetzal Rugby Club (GQRC) is a rugby team based in Guatemala City, Guatemala. The club competes in the Asociacion Guatemalteca de Rugby 15s tournament. The club uses both their location, Guatemala City, and the Guatemalan national bird, the Quetzal, as club identifiers. The club in its beginning was represented mainly by players from Guatemala but also from The United States, Argentina, Japan, Mexico, England, Italy, France and Canada. As of today, the club is represented by 95% Guatemalan players. The club used Maya numerals on the back of their jersey to identify a player's position in the first two years of activities.

History

The club was founded on March 4, 2010, being the 6th club to be created in the history of Guatemalan rugby. The institution was created by a mix of Guatemalans and expatriates with the intention of increasing the level of play in Guatemala, through competition in the existing tournament. The first formal training took place at the Inter-American College of Guatemala on March 20, 2010.

A file submitted to mediation by the Guatemalan Rugby Association by another club in Guatemala City prevented the entry of GQRC into the competition scheduled for the 2010 tournament. The support of the other participating clubs and the national team of El Salvador (Torogoces) It affected the association to dismiss the case and force Guatemala Quetzal Rugby Club to enter the national competition. Guatemala Quetzal Rugby Club won its first championship title, being the first team in the history of Guatemalan rugby to get it undefeated.

In 2011, the club was formally incorporated into the Antigua Guatemalan Rugby Association, beginning its training in January 2011. 2011 is a very fruitful year for the club with a second championship with only one game lost in the year.

In 2012 the club suffered administrative changes which had an unfavorable consequence on the organization in general; sports and administrative. For that reason the team did not go beyond the qualifying stage in the 2012 season and it was until the last quarter of 2012 when a new board of directors was formed which took office with the aim of reorganizing the club.

In 2013 the women's team of Rugby Seven 7s was created, who are currently participating in the Women's Major League and of which they have been undefeated champions since 2013 to date.

They have represented the club in different international competitions such as the Maquilishuat cup played in El Salvador, winning the first place in 2016 and second place in 2017.

At present Quetzales Rugby club contributes more than 60% of players that belong to the female Rugby team. as a selection they have represented Guatemala in different international tournaments such as:

 2016 1st Central American Place C
 2017 1st place Central American C
 2017 Gold Central American Games
 2018 Participation in the games of Barranquilla

From 2014 to date the men's team of Quetzales has contributed around 40% of players for the rugby men's team, being champions on multiple occasions of the South American major C, giving way to the 2018 team to participate in the South American tournament 4 nations

Due to the trajectory and experience of several players throughout the history of the club, Quetzales Rugby club currently contributes 5 referees of different levels certified by the ComAr to support the development of the national rugby league.

 Dafne García
 Melannie García
 Karla Mollinedo
 Fabricio Tzorin
 Samuel Prado

This also contributes to two high-level coaches that have led the Guatemalan team to be champion on different occasions internationally.

For the female branch:
 Fabrizio Tzorín

For the male branch in 15s mode:

 Jorge Montenegro

Founders of the club 

The founders of the club are as follows:

  Ricardo Alvarado Anguiano
  Colin Brown
  Farzad Darouian
  David Horner
  Lautaro Cayarga Paoltroni

Honors

Male team

 Guatemalan National Champion 2010 (undefeated)
 Guatemalan National Champion 2011
 He played the semifinal game of the Guatemalan league against Cuscatlán Rugby Club in 2013
 Guatemalan National Champion 2018 7s modality

Female team

 Guatemalan National Champion 2014 Modality 7s
 Guatemalan National Champion 2015 7s Modality
 Guatemalan National Champion 2016 7s Modality
 1st place Maquilishuat cup held in El Salvador Modality 7s
 Guatemalan National Champion 2017 Modality 7s
 2nd place Maquilishuat cup held in El Salvador Modality 7s
 Guatemalan National Champion 2018 7s Modality
 National Guatemalan Champion 2018 Tag Modality

Sponsorship

The primary sponsor of GQRC is Rattle'n Hum Bar of Guatemala City which doubles as the team's clubhouse. Colegio Interamericano supports the team by allowing the use of their secure training area. WorldGym Guatemala is the club's official gym.

Recruiting
GQRC promotes the sport of rugby in Guatemala by seeking out new players through established relationships with local schools, embassies volunteer work and by holding rugby clinics.

See also
 Rugby union in Guatemala

References

External links
 Official site

Rugby union in Guatemala
2010 establishments in Guatemala
Rugby clubs established in 2010
Sport in Guatemala City